Jack Johnson was a professional baseball third baseman in the Negro leagues. He played with the Homestead Grays in 1938 and the Toledo Crawfords in 1939.

References

External links
 and Seamheads

Homestead Grays players
Toledo Crawfords players
Year of birth missing
Year of death missing
Baseball third basemen